Bahrain competed at the 2020 Summer Paralympics in Tokyo, Japan, from 24 August to 5 September 2021. This was their tenth consecutive appearance at the Summer Paralympics since 1984.

Competitors
The following is the list of number of competitors participating in the Games:

Athletics 

Men's field

Women's field

See also 
 Bahrain at the Paralympics
 Bahrain at the 2020 Summer Olympics

External links 
 2020 Summer Paralympics website

Nations at the 2020 Summer Paralympics
2020
Summer Paralympics